Rudolph Seale (born 29 November 1966) is a South African former footballer who played at both professional and international levels as a defender. Seale last played club football for HP Silver Stars as a player-assistant coach; he also earned nine caps and one goal for the South African national side between 1993 and 1994.

Youth career
He played for Chiefs juniors U12, U14 and U18 where he was snapped up by Giant Blackpool's former Chiefs coach Eddie Lewis.

Giant Blackpool
His six-month spell at Blackpool was successful where he helped them win the OK League.

Kaizer Chiefs
Chiefs signed back their own product in 1986.

He retired in 2003 at the age of 37.

Personal life
"Mgababa" has a son, Tenasch (born 1994).

International career
Seale scored his one and only international goal on debut in the 58th minute in a 2-0 win over Botswana on 10 January 1993. He played his last international on 12 June 1994 in a 1-0 loss to Australia.

After retirement
He sends PSL stats to PA Sport in the UK on match days.

International goals

References

1966 births
Living people
South African soccer players
South Africa international soccer players
Kaizer Chiefs F.C. players
Giant Blackpool players
SuperSport United F.C. players
Association football defenders